Wild Kingdom Train Zoo is a small zoo located in Lagoon Amusement Park, Farmington, Utah, United States. Visible when riding the Wild Kingdom Train, the zoo is located on the banks of a pond. In 1967 the Animaland Train opened, taking guests past the various animal exhibits. The name of the attraction was changed around 1975 to the Wild Kingdom Train. The park has advertised the zoo as the second-largest zoo in Utah.

Animal collection

 African Lion
 Bengal Tiger
 Coatimundi
 Fennec Fox
 Grivet Monkey
 Mandrill
 Common Squirrel Monkey
 White Handed Gibbon
 DeBrazza Guenon
 Patas Monkey
 Ring Tail Lemur
 Black and White Ruffed Lemur
 Geoffrey's Marmoset
 Common Marmoset
 Red Kangaroo
 Fallow Deer
 Pygmy Goat
 Dromedary Camel
 Alpaca
 Pot Belly Pig
 Grant's Zebra
 Two Toed Sloth
 Eurasian Lynx
 Bennett Wallaby
 Aoudads
 Capybara
 Prehensile Tail Porcupine
 Asian Small Clawed Otter
 Prairie Dog
 Prevost's Squirrel
 Swainsons Toucan
 Blue and Gold Macaw
 Green Wing Macaw
 Rainbow Lory
 Duyvenbode's Lory
 White Bellied Go-Away Bird
 Plush Crested Jay
 Redbilled Hornbill
 Ostrich
 Southern Cassowary
 Emu
 Sacred Ibis
 Mute Swan
 Black Swan
 Ducks
 Kookaburra
 Eurasian Eagle Owl
 Indian Peafowl
 Golden Pheasant
 Persa Turaco
 African Spurred Tortoise
 Leopard Tortoise
 Black and White Tegu
 American Alligators
 Tarantula
 Emperor Scorpion
 Blue Morpho Butterfly
 Owl Butterfly
 Isabella Butterfly
 Tiger Longwing Butterfly
 Zebra Longwing Butterfly
 Julia Butterfly
 Blue Eared Pheasant
 Elliot's Pheasant
 Impeyan Pheasant
 Lady Amherst Pheasant
 Lady Ross Turaco
 Schmidt's Guenon 
 Golden-Headed Lion Tamarin
 Blue Crowned Pigeon
 Red Footed Tortoise
 Spectacled Owl

In the past, big cats exhibited in the zoo include Siberian tigers, a jaguar, and cougars. Other species include a brown bear, Grevy's zebra, llamas, golden eagle, camels, miniature donkey, addax, kangaroo, fallow deer, peccary, muntjac, Rocky Mountain elk, emus, ostriches and bison. In addition to the regular exhibits at the zoo, many ducks and geese have made the zoo and the adjacent pond their home.

Wild Kingdom Train

The  narrow gauge railway has two operating, steam-powered engines named Houston and Merriweather, and both were built by Crown Metal Products.  The Merriweather locomotive had previously been named Old Ironsides when it ran on a now-defunct separate railway of the same gauge in the park named Pioneer Village Railroad.  When that railroad closed, Old Ironsides was made part of the Wild Kingdom Train and given its current name.  Around the same time, one of the two other locomotives on the Wild Kingdom Train (also built by Crown) was taken out of service, put on static display, and re-themed to match the nearby Rattlesnake Rapids attraction complete with Rattlesnake Railroad livery on the tender (of course, there was never an actual railroad in the park with that name).

Guests board the train at the train station located on the South Midway of the Lagoon Amusement Park. The train travels clockwise around a lagoon, through a tunnel, past the various exhibits, and ends back at the train station.

Some of the exhibits such as the Siberian tiger, zebras, fallow deer, and the kangaroos can be seen from various paths within the park. Currently, the buffalos can only be seen from outside the park along the Lagoon Trail. All of the exhibits except for the buffalos can be seen from the train.

Protests

The Utah Animal Rights Coalition (UARC) have stated that they are concerned with the living conditions of the animals in the zoo at Lagoon. They state that the animal cages, especially for the big cats are too small, and that most new amusement park zoos have larger habitats for the big cats. Even though the cages meet or exceed the minimum USDA standards and have passed inspections, the UARC would prefer to see these animals in a more natural and larger habitat. The coalition organized a protest in July 2000 asking patrons of Lagoon to boycott the park until the Wild Kingdom ride was shut down.

Lagoon states that the park has met all of the strict regulations and has all of the required permits to run an animal park. Lagoon also disputes that the size of the animal cages are too small. Lagoon has no plans to close the zoo.  In July 2016, two Utah teenagers started a petition in an effort to convince Lagoon to improve the living conditions of the animals.

References

Zoos in Utah
Heritage railroads in Utah
Lagoon (amusement park)
Tourist attractions in Davis County, Utah
1967 establishments in Utah
Zoos established in 1967
2 ft gauge railways in the United States
Narrow gauge railroads in Utah